Clay Ketter (born May 3, 1961) is an American painter, sculptor and photographer. Ketter lives and works in Sweden.

Early life 
Ketter was born in Brunswick, Maine. He received a degree in art from the State University of New York, Purchase in 1985. Ketter worked initially as a carpenter and cabinetmaker, a skill which would become part of his artistic practice.

Work
Ketter's work often invokes traditional carpentry and house construction methods, and has been called minimalist in its form. From 1992 to 1999, Ketter produced a series of paintings resembling actual wall sections and made of the traditional components of a wall, including gypsum, plaster and drywall screws. In the 1990s he also began his so-called "kitchen works", creating minimalist sculptures that resemble IKEA kitchen cabinets constructed in unique forms and configurations.

In 1996 he presented the show Clay Ketter: New Work at White Cube in London, England. His work was included in Every Day" 11th Biennale of Sydney, 1998. In 2009 Ketter's work was presented in a solo show at the Moderna Museet, Stockholm.

References

External links 
 Official Website
  Video interview with the artist for the Moderna Museet : part 1 et part 2
  Article about his exhibition in French gallery Daniel Templon

1961 births
20th-century American photographers
20th-century American painters
American male painters
21st-century American painters
Living people
20th-century American sculptors
20th-century American male artists
21st-century American photographers
21st-century American sculptors